Cladomphalus elegans is a species of diatom of uncertain affinity. It is found in Jacob Whitman Bailey's collection on a slide with the inscription "Monterey, California; lower stratum".

References

External links 

 Cladomphalus elegans at WoRMS
 Cladomphalus elegans at diatombase.org

Bacillariophyceae
Enigmatic bikont taxa